Taner Birsel (born 1959) is a Turkish film actor. He has appeared in twelve films since 1995. He starred in The Confession, which was screened in the Un Certain Regard section at the 2002 Cannes Film Festival.

Selected filmography

References

External links
 

1959 births
Living people
Turkish male film actors
Mimar Sinan Fine Arts University alumni
People from Akhisar